The 1972–73 Utah Stars season was the 3rd season of the Stars in Utah and 6th overall in the American Basketball Association. They finished 1st in points scored at 115.6 per game, and 3rd in points allowed at 110.0 per game. In the first half of the season, they were 26–16, with a ten game winning streak in that half, along with a five game losing streak, both team highs for the season. In the second half, they went 29–13. In the playoffs, the Stars swept the San Diego Conquistadors in the Semifinals, but they lost to the Indiana Pacers in the Division Finals.  After the season, Andersen resigned.

Roster   
 44 John Beasley - Point forward
 31 Zelmo Beaty - Point forward
 24 Ron Boone - Shooting guard
 40 Glen Combs - Shooting guard
 25 Gerald Govan - Center
 33 Ira Harge - Center
 21 Mike Jackson - Power forward
 15 Jimmy Jones - Point guard
 32 Larry Jones - Point guard
 14 Roderick McDonald - Small forward
 35 Cincy Powell - Small forward
 12 Bob Warren - Shooting guard
 32 Charles Williams - Point guard
 42 Willie Wise - Small forward

Final standings

Western Division

Playoffs
Western Division Semifinals vs. San Diego Conquistadors

Stars win series, 4–0

Western Division Finals vs. Indiana Pacers

Stars lose series 4–2

Awards and honors 
1973 ABA All-Star Game selections (game played on February 6, 1973)
Willie Wise
Zelmo Beaty
Jimmy Jones
All-ABA Second Team selection: Jimmy Jones.

References

External links
 RememberTheABA.com 1972–73 regular season and playoff results
 Utah Stars page

Utah Stars seasons
Utah Stars
Utah Stars, 1972–73
Utah Stars, 1972–73